Information loss may refer to:
 Data loss in information systems
 lossy compression
 Digital obsolescence
 Black hole information paradox in theoretical physics